Events in the year 1845 in Norway.

Incumbents
Monarch: Oscar I

Events

Skutterudite, a mineral containing nickel and iron, was discovered. The discovery was made in Skuterud Mines, Modum, Buskerud.
The twelfth Storting convened, following the 1844 election.
The Dissenter Act was enacted on 16 July 1845.

Notable births
 
 
 
 

10 January – Jørund Telnes, farmer, teacher, writer and politician (d. 1892).
17 January – Erika Nissen, pianist (d. 1903)
7 March – Jens Braage Halvorsen, librarian, magazine editor and literary historian (d. 1900).
27 March – Jakob Sverdrup, bishop and politician (d. 1899).
18 June – Gustav Storm, historian (d. 1903).
15 July – Christian Holtermann Knudsen, typographer, newspaper editor, publisher, trade unionist and politician (d. 1929)
17 July – Ragna Vilhelmine Nielsen, pedagogue and feminist (d. 1924)
6 August – Edvard Liljedahl, politician and Minister (d. 1924)
5 September – Hans Hein Theodor Nysom, politician (d. 1903)
9 September – Christen Christensen, shipyard owner, ship-owner and whaling manager (d. 1923)
28 September – Cæsar Peter Møller Boeck, dermatologist (d. 1917)
10 October – Anton Jörgen Andersen, composer (d. 1926)
 7 December – Tinius Olsen, Norwegian American engineer and inventor (d. 1932)

Full date unknown
Sofus Arctander, politician and Minister (d. 1924)
Peter Olaf Debes, politician
Hans Jensen Haga, politician
Ludwig Andreas Olsen, United States Navy sailor awarded two Medals of Honor (d. 1886)
Ole Andres Olsen, Seventh-day Adventist minister and administrator (d. 1915)
Oscar Ludvig Stoud Platou, jurist and professor (d. 1929)
Jon Eilevsson Steintjønndalen, Hardanger fiddle maker (d. 1902)

Notable deaths

13 February – Henrik Steffens, philosopher, scientist, and poet (b. 1773)
29 March – Ingebrigt Belle, peasant agitator (b. 1773)
17 May – Christopher Borgersen Hoen, farmer and politician (b. 1767).
12 July – Henrik Wergeland, poet (b. 1808)
22 October – Fredrik Riis, civil servant (b. 1789)
31 October – Johan Reinhardt, professor in zoology (b. 1778)

Full date unknown
Erich Haagensen Jaabech, farmer and politician (b. 1761)
Christian Sørenssen, bishop and politician

See also

References